"Shakin' All Over" is a song originally performed by Johnny Kidd & the Pirates. It was written by leader Johnny Kidd, and his original recording reached No. 1 on the UK Singles Chart in August 1960.  The song is sometimes credited to Frederick Albert Heath, which is Kidd's real name. Kidd's recording was not a hit outside Europe. In other parts of the world the song is better known by recordings from other artists.

A version by Chad Allan and the Expressions, later known as The Guess Who, was recorded in December 1964. It reached #1 in Canada in the spring of 1965, #22 in the US and #27 in Australia. Another famous recording by The Who was featured on their 1970 album Live at Leeds.

Normie Rowe's 1965 version reached No. 1 in Australia as a double A-side with "Que Sera Sera".

History

Johnny Kidd version
The musicians who performed on the original recording were Johnny Kidd (vocals), Alan Caddy (rhythm guitar), Brian Gregg (bass), Clem Cattini (drums) and Joe Moretti (lead guitar). Kidd was quoted as saying: When I was going round with a bunch of lads and we happened to see a girl who was a real sizzler, we used to say that she gave us 'quivers down the membranes'. It was a standard saying with us referring to any attractive girl. I can honestly say that it was this more than anything that inspired me to write "Shakin' All Over".

The Twiliters version
In 1964, a band from Plattsburgh, New York called the Twiliters recorded a version of "Shakin' All Over" and released it on the B-side of a single. Bill Kennedy, the leader of the group, had heard the song while stationed in Germany with the US Air Force. The A-side was called "(Everybody's Goin' To) Rollerland" and the songs were recorded before a crowd at the local Rollerland skating rink. It was released by Empire Records and gained some regional success but did not chart.

The Guess Who version
The song gained more fame after it was recorded in Winnipeg in December 1964 by a group called Chad Allan and the Expressions. In the spring of 1965 the record became a #1 hit in Canada. The group's label Quality Records credited the artist as "Guess Who?" in an attempt to disguise their origin and hint that the group might be a British Invasion act. The actual name was revealed a few months later, but radio DJs continued to announce the artist as "Guess Who?". This prompted the group to change their name to The Guess Who. This version was also a #22 hit in the United States. In 1975 The Guess Who recorded a new song called "When The Band Was Singin' 'Shakin' All Over'".  Though it makes lyrical reference to the original, this is a distinctly different song.

Mae West Version
Actress and singer Mae West released a version of "Shakin' All Over" on the LP Way Out West, released in the US by Tower Records in 1966. In the UK it appeared on the Stateside label.

Normie Rowe version
The Guess Who's version also became a #27 hit in Australia, but another version became a national #1 hit in late 1965 for Normie Rowe.  Rowe's version (backed by "Que Sera Sera") was one of the biggest-selling singles of the decade in that country. Rowe had recorded his take on the song before The Guess Who, and based his release on a 1962 version by Johnny Chester.

The Who version

The song has been performed many times by The Who, starting in the 1960s, (sometimes in a medley with "Spoonful"). The best known performances were at Woodstock in 1969 and on Live at Leeds in 1970. In Randy Bachman's autobiography, he says that when he met Who bass player John Entwistle, he was told that people constantly got The Who and The Guess Who mixed up. Tired of being yelled at for not playing the song, the Who started playing it just to keep the crowd happy.  Bachman responded that the Guess Who had the same reasons for playing "My Generation". Entwistle, a fan of 1950s and 1960s rock and roll and rockabilly music, also performed the song with his solo band and incorporated a bass solo into the middle of the song, accompanied only by his drummer Steve Luongo.

Suzi Quatro version
Suzi Quatro included her version on her debut album, Suzi Quatro (1973).

Tin Machine version
Tin Machine included a live version in their single You Belong in Rock n' Roll (1991).

The Head Cat version
The Head Cat also recorded this song in their second studio album, Walk the Walk...Talk the Talk (2001).

Cows version 
Minneapolis noise rock band Cows featured a version titled "Shaking" on their second studio album Daddy Has a Tail! (1989)

References in popular culture

The Guess Who version was included in the Battlefield Vietnam soundtrack. It can also be heard in the 2006 Edie Sedgwick biopic, Factory Girl. The Guess Who version was also featured in a Hugo Boss XY and XX Fragrance commercial, featuring Jonathan Rhys Meyers and Bette Franke.
The song was referenced in a 1975 song by The Guess Who titled "When The Band Was Singin' 'Shakin' All Over'".
"Shakin' All Over" was featured several times in the UK TV series Heartbeat (1992 - 2007) (usually the version by Johnny Kidd and the Pirates) and in the first ever episode of the UK TV series The Royal on 19 January 2003.
Shakin' All Over is the name of a CBC Television documentary on Canadian rock music in the 1950s and 1960s.
The song is featured in the Mr. Bean episode "Mind the Baby, Mr. Bean".
The Pirates version of the song was featured in the film Crooked House.
A version by Wanda Jackson appears during the end credits of Bridesmaids, as taken from her album The Party Ain't Over (2011).
The album Sea of Tears by Eilen Jewell includes the track.
A cover of the song by Rose Hill Drive is included on the game soundtrack for Stubbs the Zombie (2005).
The Johnny Kidd and the Pirates version was played over the end credits in S02E03 of the television series Britannia.
A cover by Fugazi was included for their 1999 album Instrument Soundtrack.

References

External links
 Musicdish.com

1960 songs
1960 singles
1965 singles
The Guess Who songs
Humble Pie (band) songs
The Beach Boys songs
Van Morrison songs
Wanda Jackson songs
Willy Moon songs
Number-one singles in Australia
UK Singles Chart number-one singles
RPM Top Singles number-one singles
Quality Records singles